Swinford in the English county of Oxfordshire is a hamlet in the civil parish of Cumnor. It lies on the road between Eynsham and Farmoor (B4044) on the south bank of the River Thames. The Swinford Toll Bridge carrying the B4044 crosses the River Thames here. In 1974 it was transferred from Berkshire to the county of Oxfordshire.

See also
 Pinkhill Lock
Swinford Toll Bridge

External links

Villages in Oxfordshire